Leonardo "Léo" da Silva Passos (born 13 March 1999) is a Brazilian footballer who currently plays as a forward for Náutico, on loan from Palmeiras.

Honours
 Náutico

 Campeonato Pernambucano: 2022

Career statistics

References

External links

1999 births
Living people
Sportspeople from Campinas
Brazilian footballers
Association football forwards
Campeonato Brasileiro Série B players
Associação Atlética Ponte Preta players
Sociedade Esportiva Palmeiras players
Londrina Esporte Clube players
América Futebol Clube (MG) players